Goan Catholic names and surnames encompass the different types of names and surnames used by the Goan Catholics of Goa.

Names
Konkani language variants of most Goan Catholic names are derived from Hebrew, Greek, and Latin names from the Old and New Testament Biblical canons. Nowadays Hindu names like Sandeep, Rahul and Anita, etc. are also given. Portuguese names like António, João, Maria, Ana are also common among Goan Catholics who follow Portuguese culture. British names (e.g. Kevin, Shelley) and other European names (e.g. Benito, Heidi), which have no Konkani variants, are also popular.

Surnames
The Portuguese surnames such as Rodrigues, Fernandes and Carvalho are commonly found among Goan Catholics after centuries of colonial rule in Portuguese Goa and Damaon, and generally follow the second declension. These Portuguese surnames are also observed among the Mangalorean Catholics, the Bombay East Indian Catholics, the Latin Catholics of Malabar& in other Indo-Portuguese areas such as Damaon and Chaul. Portuguese surnames are very popular across the world especially in the Lusophone countries of Portugal, Brazil, Angola, Macao, Cape Verde, East Timor, Equatorial Guinea, Guinea-Bissau, São Tomé and Príncipe and Mozambique.

Bold indicates common surnamesItalics indicates uncommon surnames

Notes

References 

Goan society